, also known as , is a Japanese manga series by Mari Matsuzawa, serialized in Fujimi Shobo's Monthly Dragon Age since November 9, 2010. An anime television series premiered in Japan in January 2014. It was adapted into a light novel written by Kougetsu Mikazuki, which was published on January 18, 2014 under Fujimi Shobo's Fujimi Fantasia Bunko imprint. A live action film adaptation premiered on May 17, 2014.

Plot
High school girl Kanzaki Mitsuki "inherits" an older brother when her mother remarries a fellow divorcée with a son. Soon after, her new stepdad is transferred overseas and her mother follows him there, leaving Mitsuki to live alone with her new stepbrother, Yuya. Feeling abandoned by her mother, she stays distant from Yuya, never really getting along very well with him nor even keeping a conversation with him. One day, Mitsuki is visited by an angel/ghost named Hiyori, who takes over her body and makes sexual advances towards Yuya. Hiyori is the lost spirit of a girl who in life loved Yuya deeply, however she died before she could confess her feelings and thus can not reach the gates of heaven and obtain eternal peace.

In order to reach heaven, Hiyori puts a chastity belt on Mitsuki that fills up every time Mitsuki has sexual feelings from Yuya, whether it be from simply going on a date with him to kissing and sex. For every time it fills up a little, Hiyori gains a step on a bridge that connects her current situation and the literal gates of heaven. If Mitsuki doesn't help her then it will result in both their deaths, and so if she wants to get rid of the annoying Hiyori, Mitsuki has to make some bold and sexy moves against her own brother, even if he is just a stepbrother. As the series progresses Mitsuki questions if the feelings towards her brother are of true love that goes beyond just brother and sister or if they are a result of Hiyori's feelings towards him.

Characters

Main characters

Played by: Tenka Hashimoto
The main protagonist, Mitsuki has been living with her stepbrother, Yūya since her mother's second marriage. She had a bad relationship with her real father, resulting in her cold view toward all men, without any exception. She's possessed and haunted by Hiyori's ghost and forced to help her pass on by helping her experience "lovey-dovey" situations with Yūya; if she doesn't Hiyori claims she'll die and go to hell with her. The possession caused a chastity belt to appear on her, which she cannot take off except in the bath and use the bathroom, and then only at the moment it's absolutely necessary, after which it appears again.

Played by: Yukichi Kobayashi
Mitsuki's step-brother. An average Japanese high school student, Yūya's goal is to have a fine sibling relationship with his new little sister. He is generally good-hearted, but because he grew up without a mother and little companionship with females, he has an incredibly poor ability to understand and empathize with Mitsuki's feelings. He also has a tendency to make very inaccurate assumptions based on unusual circumstances, and despite his good intentions, his attempts to help Mitsuki often cause things to become worse, such as when she needed to go to the restroom, and he thought she was sick and forcefully dragged her to the school clinic despite her protests. Due to his misunderstanding about Mitsuki's chastity belt and Hiyori, he believes that Mitsuki and Hiyori are a "lesbian cosplay couple".

Played by: Mayu
The spirit of a dead girl, who is possessing/manipulating Mitsuki from time to time. Hiyori has no memories of when she was still alive, only including remembering her own name; the name Hiyori Kotobuki isn't her real name. But does remember her love for Yūya, to the point of viewing Yūya as her own older brother. Hiyori often pushes Mitsuki to engage in an incestuous relationship with her step-brother even to Mitsuki's extreme protest. Hiyori is also shown to be extremely athletic, displaying great talent in any sport as shown when possessing Mitsuki.

Played by: Mika Yano
Yūya's childhood friend. When the two were young, Yukina acts as the older sister to Yūya and is known by Yūya to be quite tomboyish. As a teenager, Yukina grows more feminine and ladylike and develops feelings for Yūya.

Other characters

Yūya's classmate and best friend, Shōtarō Torii wishes he had the brother-sister incest he fantasizes Yūya could be having with Mitsuki. However, he hardly ever gets along with his own sister, Moa Torii. That aside, he doesn't hesitate to flirt with girls of any age, younger or older, such as with Mitsuki's aunt, Nanami Akesaka.

The rather quiet, glasses-wearing classmate to Yūya, Neko seems to know about Mitsuki's situation with Hiyori. A few times, Neko has been in a position to help push the brother-sister relationship along, such as providing tickets for everyone to a water park owned by her father. In reality, it is quite possible Neko is directly involved in Mitsuki's and Hiyori's situation with the chastity belt, such as an agent of Heaven, as suggested by the anime's opening video.
At the same time, when Neko herself ends up a part of such situations, such as at the hot springs inn vacation, she refrains from showing off way too much skin, so she wears a one piece swimsuit to the bath.

Voiced by: Manami Tanaka
Played by: Kazue Akita
She is Mitsuki's classmate and shown as a good friend of her.

Mitsuki's aunt, and a bit of a drinker, Nanami is charged with checking in on Yūya and Mitsuki while their parents are away.

Shotaro Torii's younger sister, and a middle school student. She and her brother barely get along, which makes Moa often wish she had a nicer older brother, like Yūya is to Mitsuki. When arguing with her brother, she often uses the insult "Bald"/"Baldy", even though her brother has a full head of hair.

Media

Manga
The manga was published from November 9, 2010 to May 9, 2016, and was released in eleven tankōbon volumes.

Anime

An anime television series adaptation premiered on Tokyo MX and Sun TV on January 4, 2014. Additionally, the series is airing on AT-X and BS11 and streamed with English subtitles by Crunchyroll. The anime is directed by Hiroyuki Hata at studio Project No.9 with writing by Hideyuki Kurata and music by Ryosuke Nakanishi. An original episode will be released on Blu-ray Disc bundled with the limited edition of the seventh manga volume, was published on April 30, 2014. An OVA episode was also made, but due to its content it was deemed "too risqué" for television broadcast. Rather than airing it, the episode was only released through the seventh manga volume as a bonus item. The anime has been licensed by Crunchyroll with distribution by Discotek Media, and they've released the series on DVD July 28, 2015.

The show has become subject to a broadcast decency investigation in Japan by the Broadcasting Ethics and Program Improvement Organization, following concerns of sexually explicit themes which do not match the show's television airing time slot on Tokyo MX and Sun TV.

Live action film
On May 7, 2014, a live action version of Recently, My Sister Is Unusual opened in theatres in Japan. It was directed by Yuuki Aoyama and Kouen Igii, and starred Tenka Hashimoto as Mitsuki, Yuuichi Kobayashi as Yuya and Mayu Mitsui as Hiyori. The screenplay was written by Kouen Igii and Takehiko Minato. It was produced by Kadokawa Pictures and Pony Canyon, and distributed by Kadokawa Pictures.

Reception
Tim Jones and Nicoletta Browne of THEM Anime Reviews gave the series an overall rating of one star, criticizing the character Hiyori, the lack of character development for the characters, and the series' ending. The reviewers concluded: "we almost gave it two stars because of some well-developed backstory at times and the occasional cute scene, but overall the terrible first half and Hiyori drown out all the possible good this series has." Anime News Network's Theron Martin gave the series an overall rating of C, concluding that the series "is not a total disaster, but it stacks the deck strongly enough against itself that it stands in the lower echelons of otaku-oriented fan service titles. What little it has going for it is maddeningly short on elaboration, and the tepid end of the series suggests that at least another season will be required to get any real answers."

References

External links
  
 Anime official website 
 
 

2014 anime television series debuts
2014 Japanese television series endings
2014 Japanese novels
2016 comics endings
Anime series based on manga
Discotek Media
Incest in anime and manga
Fujimi Fantasia Bunko
Fujimi Shobo manga
Kadokawa Dwango franchises
Live-action films based on manga
Light novels
Manga adapted into films
Manga adapted into television series
Project No.9
Romantic comedy anime and manga
Shōnen manga
Supernatural anime and manga
Tokyo MX original programming
Japanese romantic comedy films
Japanese supernatural films